Cardamine is a large genus of flowering plants in the mustard family, Brassicaceae, known as bittercresses and toothworts. It contains more than 200 species of annuals and perennials. Species in this genus can be found worldwide, except the Antarctic, in diverse habitats. The name Cardamine is derived from the Greek kardaminē, water cress, from kardamon, pepper grass.

Description
The leaves can have different forms, from minute to medium in size. They can be simple, pinnate or bipinnate. They are basal and cauline (growing on the upper part of the stem), with narrow tips. They are rosulate (forming a rosette). The blade margins can be entire, serrate or dentate. The stem internodes lack firmness.

The nearly radially symmetrical flowers grow in a racemose many-flowered inflorescence or in corymbs. The white, pink or purple flowers are minute to medium-sized. The petals are longer than the sepals. The fertile flowers are hermaphroditic.

Taxonomy
The genus Cardamine was first formally named in 1753 by Carl Linnaeus in his Species Plantarum. , there are 230 accepted species in Kew's Plants of the World Online database. An additional 31 new species found in New Zealand were described in 2017 but are not listed in the Plants of the World Online .

The genus name Dentaria is a commonly used synonym for some species of Cardamine.

Species

Select species include:

Ecology

This plant is also used as one of the main food sources for the butterfly Pieris oleracea.

Uses
The roots of most species are edible raw.

Some species were reputed to have medicinal qualities (treatment of heart or stomach ailments).

References

Bibliography
 Taxonomic Revision of Cardamine

External links

 
Brassicaceae genera
Taxa named by Carl Linnaeus